Si'en is a town in Huanjiang Maonan Autonomous County, Guangxi, China.

Administrative division
As of 2021, the town is divided into two communities and twelve villages: 
Chengbei Community
Chengnan Community
Zhongshan
Dieling
Chenshuang
Zhongxing
Xi'nan
Naihe
Sanle
Anliang
Renhe
Qingtan
Wenhua
Fulong

History
The region was historically called Si'en County and Yibei County. Si'en County was controlled by the People's Liberation Army (PLA) in November 1949 and came under the jurisdiction of Qingyuan Special District.

In August 1952, Si'en County was revoked and Huanjiang County was set up, which was under the jurisdiction of Yishan Special District. In 1958, its name was changed to Red Flag People's Commune and belonged to Liuzhou Special District. One year later, it split into two communes: Chengguan People's Commune and Dacai People's Commune and soon merged to form Chengguan District in 1962. In May 1965, it came under the jurisdiction of Hechi Special District. In 1968, it reverted to its former name of Chengguan People's Commune. In 1984, it was upgraded to a town named Si'en, which is still in use now.

Geography
The town lies at the south of Huanjiang Maonan Autonomous County, bordering Shuiyuan Town to the west, Jinchengjiang District to the south, Luoyang Town and Da'an Township to the north, and Dacai Township to the east.

The Huanjiang River flows through the town north to south.

Climate

Economy
The economy of the town has a predominantly agricultural orientation, including farming and pig-breeding. The main crops are rice and corn. Sugarcane is one of the important economic crops in the region.

Demographics

The 2019 census showed the town's population to be 52,755, an increase of 16.9% from the 2011 census.

Tourist attractions
The Aishan Forest Park is located within the town limits and has camping, swimming, boating, fishing, rodeos, dancing and sporting events.

Transportation
The Provincial Highway S205 passes across the town north to south.

The town is crossed by the Guiyang–Nanning high-speed railway.

References

Bibliography

 

Divisions of Huanjiang Maonan Autonomous County